Domeij is a surname of Swedish origin. Notable people with the surname include:

Anna Domeij, Swedish curler
Åsa Domeij, Swedish politician 
Gunnar Domeij, Swedish goalkeeper 
Kristoffer Domeij, American soldier
Sofia Domeij, Swedish biathlete